The Sacred Spirit is a 2021 internationally co-produced science fiction comedy-drama film playing with science fiction themes directed and written by Chema García Ibarra. The cast is led by Nacho Fernández, Llum Arques, Joanna Valverde and Rocío Ibáñez. It is a Spain–France–Turkey international co-production.

Plot 
Primarily set in Elche, the fiction tracks the members of an association of ufologists that see their secret mankind-changing master plan imperiled after their leader dies. Meanwhile, everyone else is looking for a missing girl.

Cast

Production 
A joint Spain–France–Turkey co-production, the film was produced by Apellániz & De Sosa and Jaibo Films alongside La Fábrica Nocturna Cinèma and Teferruat Films, with the participation of Movistar+, RTVE and TRT, support and help  from the IVC, ICAA, the Turkish Ministry of Culture and Tourism, CNC Cinema du Monde and Eurimages. Filming began on 12 October 2020 in Elche.

Release 
The Sacred Spirit had its world premiere at the 74th Locarno Film Festival (LFF) on 10  August 2021. The film was also presented in October 2021 at the Toulouse Spanish Film Festival and on 8 November 2021 at the 18th Seville European Film Festival (SEFF). Distributed by La Aventura, it was theatrically released in Spain on 26 November 2021.

Arrow Films inked UK rights for the film whereas HBO Europe acquired rights to the film for its European territories for a HBO Max release.

Reception 
The American review-aggregation website Rotten Tomatoes recorded a 92% approval rating, with an average score of 7.9/10, based on 13 reviews.

Jay Weissberg of Variety considered the "puckish" debut full-length film imagining dark goings-on among UFO believers to be a "an immaculately framed feature generating uneasy amusement in the viewer".

Accolades 

|-
| rowspan = "6" align = "center" | 2021 || rowspan = "6" | 4th Berlanga Awards || colspan = "2" | Best Feature Film ||  || rowspan = "6" | 
|-
| Best Director || Chema García Ibarra || 
|-
| Best Screenplay || Chema García Ibarra || 
|-
| Best Leading Actor || Nacho Fernández || 
|-
| Best Art Direction || Leonor Díaz || 
|-
| Best Production Supervision || Miguel Molina || 
|-
| align = "center" rowspan = "3"  | 2022 || rowspan = "2" | 9th Feroz Awards || colspan="2" | Best Drama Film ||  || rowspan = "2" | 
|-
| colspan = "2" | Arrebato Award (Fiction) || 
|-
| Spanish Screenwriters' Union Awards || Best Screenplay in a Comedy Feature Film || Chema García Ibarra ||  || 
|-
| align = "center" | 2022 || colspan = "2" | 48th Seattle International Film Festival || Special Jury Prize for Originality of Vision (Ibero-American competition) ||  || align = "center" | 
|}

See also 
 List of Spanish films of 2021

References

External links  
 The Sacred Spirit at ICAA's Catálogo de Cinespañol

2021 films
2021 science fiction films
2021 comedy-drama films
Spanish science fiction comedy-drama films
French science fiction comedy-drama films
Turkish science fiction films
Turkish comedy-drama films
Films set in the Valencian Community
Films shot in the province of Alicante
2020s Spanish-language films
Films about missing people
UFO-related films
2020s Spanish films
2020s French films